Colignonia is a genus of flowering plants belonging to the family Nyctaginaceae.

Its native range is Colombia to Northern Argentina.

Species:

Colignonia glomerata 
Colignonia ovalifolia 
Colignonia parviflora 
Colignonia pentoptera 
Colignonia rufopilosa 
Colignonia scandens

References

Nyctaginaceae
Caryophyllales genera